The 2022–23 Idaho Vandals men's basketball team represented the University of Idaho in the Big Sky Conference during the 2022–23 NCAA Division I men's basketball season. Led by fourth-year head coach Zac Claus, the Vandals played their home games on campus at ICCU Arena in Moscow, Idaho.

Previous season
The Vandals finished the 2021–22 season at 9–22 (6–14 in Big Sky, eighth). In the conference tournament, they were defeated by Sacramento State in the first round.

Roster

Schedule and results

|-
!colspan=12 style=| Exhibition

|-
!colspan=12 style=| Non-conference regular season

|-
!colspan=12 style=| Big Sky regular season

|-
!colspan=12 style=| 

Sources

References

Idaho Vandals men's basketball seasons
Idaho
Idaho Vandals men's basketball
Idaho Vandals men's basketball